La 1re, La 1ère or La Première may refer to:

 La Première (Belgium), a Belgian French-language radio channel produced by RTBF
 La Première Chaîne (Canada), Radio-Canada radio network (SRC Radio 1)
 La Première (RTI), a terrestrial television channel in Côte d'Ivoire
 La Première (France), a network of radio and television stations for the overseas departments and territories of France
 La Première (Switzerland), a French-language radio network in Switzerland
 La Première, the marketing name for Air France's first class product

See also

 Premiere (disambiguation), including "Première"
 Premier (disambiguation), including "le Premier" (le 1er) masculine of "Première"
 The First (disambiguation)
 First (disambiguation)
 Une (disambiguation), 
 Un (disambiguation), 
 1 (disambiguation)